Anna-Lena Fritzon (born 7 March 1965) is a Swedish former cross-country skier who competed from 1985 to 1994. Her best career finish at the Winter Olympics was sixth twice in the 4 × 5 km relay (1988, 1994) while her best individual finish was ninth in the 20 km event at Calgary in 1988.

Fritzon's best finish at the FIS Nordic World Ski Championships was tenth in the 30 km event at Falun in 1993. Her best World Cup finish was second in a 20 km event in Italy in 1988.

Fritzon, born in 1965 in Falun, was also a successful triathlete with a second place in European World Championship held in 1986 in Immenstadt, West Germany. She was ninth in the 10 km in the 1984 Biathlon World Championship held in Chamonix, France. As a cross-country skier Fritzon became the first Swedish woman to win a gold medal in Junior World Championship in the 10 km event held in 1985 in Täsch, Switzerland. The same year she was honoured with "Estrellas Gold chips" for the debutant in Swedish sport of the year together with the football player Mats Gren. Her best World Cup finish was second in the 20 km event held in 1988 in Toblach, Italy and number three in the World Cup at Falun, Sweden in 1985. In the 1988 Winter Olympic Games her best place was ninth in the 20 km event. Fritzon's best finish at the FIS Nordic World Ski Championship 1993 was tenth in the 30 km event at Falun, Sweden. She has one gold, three silver and five bronze medals to her credit in the Swedish cross-country skiing championships.

Cross-country skiing results
All results are sourced from the International Ski Federation (FIS).

Olympic Games

World Championships

World Cup

Season standings

Individual podiums

2 podiums

Team podiums

 3 podiums

References

External links

Women's 4 x 5 km cross-country relay Olympic results: 1976-2002 
Triathlon Anna-Lena Fritzon (Suéde)tous les resultats de la saison
https://web.archive.org/web/20120130023045/http://www.skidor.com/sv/SvenskaSkidforbundet/Historikochstatistik/JVMochJEM/Svenskamedaljorer-nordiskagrenar/
Fakta FIS hemsida
http://www.the-sports.org/biathlon-world-championship

1965 births
Cross-country skiers at the 1988 Winter Olympics
Cross-country skiers at the 1994 Winter Olympics
Living people
Swedish female cross-country skiers
People from Falun
Olympic cross-country skiers of Sweden
20th-century Swedish women